Save the Children International, formerly known as the International Save The Children Alliance, is a worldwide non-profit organization that aims to improve the living of children. There are 30 Save the Children member organizations around the world.

History
The Save the Children Alliance was founded in Geneva in 1972 by a number of Save the Children members, to co-ordinate their work.

In 1997 a more formal structure was set up and the organisation was renamed the International Save the Children Alliance. Soon afterward, a permanent secretariat was set up in London. This was later moved to Geneva but currently is based once more in London. Since 2010 it has been known as Save the Children International.

Save the Children International continues the worldwide aims of the original Save the Children organization, which was founded in 1919 in London and became part of the International Save the Children Union founded in Geneva in 1920.

Save the Children was founded in 1919 after the First World War. It was founded in the United Kingdom by Eglantyne Jebb, a British social reformer, in order to improve the lives of children through better education, economic help, emergency aid, and health care in the United Kingdom. In 1924, the League of Nations adopted Jebb’s charter on children’s rights.

References

External links 
 

 Organizations established in 1977
 Save the Children